Derbyshire County Cricket Club in 1899 was the cricket season when the English club Derbyshire had been playing for twenty-eight years. It was their fifth season in the County Championship and they won three matches to finish fifteenth in the Championship table.

1899 season
Derbyshire played eighteen games in the County Championship in 1899, one match against MCC and one match against the touring Australians. They only won two matches in the County Championship, which left them at the bottom of the table. The early death of George Davidson from pneumonia in February had deprived Derbyshire of a valuable all-rounder with several years potential service ahead of him, and left the bowling dependent almost entirely upon Hulme, who had probably his best season with 93 first-class wickets in a very unfavourable summer for bowlers due to dry weather. The captain was Samuel Hill Wood in his first season as captain. Levi Wright was top scorer. William Storer played for England in the first test against Australia in June.

The most significant addition to the Derbyshire squad in the season was Joe Humphries who became a long-serving wicket keeper. John Young played the first of three seasons in which he played frequently, but the remainder who made their debut played only in 1899 or intermittently thereafter. George Gregory and Thomas Higson played intermittently up to 1910.  Richard Kenward played one season and next played for Sussex. Albert Steeples, Leonard Ward and 
Frank Wright played one career first class match each during the season.

Matches

{| class="wikitable" width="100%"
! bgcolor="#efefef" colspan=6 | List of matches
|- bgcolor="#efefef"
!No.
!Date
!V
!Result 
!Margin
!Notes
|- 
|1
 | 4 May 1899
|  Surrey Kennington Oval 
|bgcolor="#FF0000"|Lost
| 10 wickets
| Brockwell 102; Jephson 5–51 
|- 
|2
|15 May 1899
| Warwickshire  County Ground, Derby 
|bgcolor="#FFCC00"|Drawn
|
| Dickens 5–22 and 6–23; JJ Hulme 7–58 
|- 
|3
|18 May 1899
| MCC    Lord's Cricket Ground, St John's Wood 
|bgcolor="#00FF00"|Won
| 2 wickets
| Martin 5–13 and 6–76 
|- 
|4
|22 May 1899
| Hampshire County Ground, Southampton 
|bgcolor="#00FF00"|Won
| 7 wickets
| JJ Hulme 5–60; Baldwin 6–113 
|- 
|5
| 25 May 1899
| Leicestershire Grace Road, Leicester 
|bgcolor="#FFCC00"|Drawn
|
| de Trafford 117; JJ Hulme 5–35 
|- 
|6
|5 Jun 1899
|  Surrey Queen's Park, Chesterfield 
|bgcolor="#FF0000"|Lost
| Innings and 164 runs
| Jephson 5–12 
|- 
|7
|8 Jun 1899
| Yorkshire Dewsbury and Savile Ground 
|bgcolor="#FF0000"|Lost
| 9 wickets
| JA Berwick 5–82; Rhodes 5–65; Hirst 5–57 
|- 
|8
|12 Jun 1899
| Lancashire  Old Trafford, Manchester 
|bgcolor="#FF0000"|Lost
| 8 wickets
| Cutell 120; Hallows 5–31 
|- 
|9
|19 Jun 1899
| Nottinghamshire  Trent Bridge, Nottingham 
|bgcolor="#FF0000"|Lost
| Innings and 180 runs
| Wass 5–42; Bottom 5–34; H Bagshaw 5–18 
|- 
|10
| 22 Jun 1899
| Essex   County Ground, Leyton 
|bgcolor="#00FF00"|Won
| 98 runs
| Mead 6–54 and 5–51; JJ Hulme 6–52 and 6–29 
|- 
|11
|26 Jun 1899
| Australia County Ground, Derby 
|bgcolor="#FF0000"|Lost
| Innings and 249 runs
| Trumble 100; Noble 156; Darling 134*; McLeod 6–89 
|- 
|12
| 3 Jul 1899
| Yorkshire County Ground, Derby  
|bgcolor="#FF0000"|Lost
| Innings and 160 runs
| Brown 192; JJ Hulme 7–124; Wainwright 7–38 
|- 
|13
|13 Jul 1899
| Lancashire  North Road Ground, Glossop  
|bgcolor="#FF0000"|Lost
| 269 runs
| JJ Hulme 6–50; Mold 7–19; W Storer 5–59; A Ward 6–29 
|- 
|14
| 20 Jul 1899
| Leicestershire Queen's Park, Chesterfield 
|bgcolor="#FFCC00"|Drawn
|
| W Storer 216 
|- 
|15
|24 Jul 1899
| Essex   County Ground, Derby 
|bgcolor="#FFCC00"|Drawn
|
| Perrin 196; Bull 5–71 
|- 
|16
|31 Jul 1899
| Worcestershire  County Ground, Derby 
|bgcolor="#FFCC00"|Drawn
|
| Arnold 121; W Sugg 107; W Bestwick 5–86 
|- 
|17
|7 Aug 1899
| Hampshire County Ground, Derby 
|bgcolor="#FF0000"|Lost
| 9 wickets
| LG Wright 138; Heseltine 7–106; JJ Hulme 6–108 
|- 
|18
|17 Aug 1899
| Worcestershire  County Ground, New Road, Worcester 
|bgcolor="#FF0000"|Lost
| Innings and 218 runs
| G Bromley-Martin 129; H Foster 162; Lowe 102; Burrows 5–37; Wilson 5–45
|- 
|19
|21 Aug 1899
| Nottinghamshire  County Ground, Derby 
|bgcolor="#FFCC00"|Drawn
|
| LG Wright 115; A Jones 5–140 
|- 
|20
| 28 Aug 1899
| Warwickshire  Edgbaston, Birmingham 
|bgcolor="#FFCC00"|Drawn
|
|  
|-

Statistics

County Championship batting averages

County Championship bowling averages

Wicket-keeper

 William Storer Catches 16, Stumping 5 
 Joe Humphries Catches 14, Stumping 4 
 Levi Wright Catches 16, Stumping 1

See also
Derbyshire County Cricket Club seasons
1899 English cricket season

References

1899 in English cricket
Derbyshire County Cricket Club seasons
English cricket seasons in the 19th century